Caryocar amygdaliforme is a species of tree in the Caryocaraceae family. It is native to South America.

References

amygdaliforme
Endangered plants
Trees of Peru
Taxonomy articles created by Polbot